Zarchuiyeh-ye Do (also Romanized as Zārchū’īyeh-ye Do; also known as Zārchū and Zārchū’īyeh) is a village in Sarduiyeh Rural District, Sarduiyeh District, Jiroft County, Kerman Province, Iran. At the 2006 census, its population was 11, in 6 families.

References 

Populated places in Jiroft County